NVH may refer to:

Newhaven Harbour railway station, a railway station in Sussex, England
Noise, vibration, and harshness, mechanical properties of vehicles
Norwegian School of Veterinary Science, a public university in Oslo, Norway
NVH-1 and NVH-4 armored fighting vehicles, variants of the Type 85 AFV